Konanova is a rural locality (a village) in Oshibskoye Rural Settlement, Kudymkarsky District, Perm Krai, Russia. The population was 210 as of 2010. There are three streets.

Geography 
Konanova is located 25 km northeast of Kudymkar (the district's administrative centre) by road. Osipova is the nearest rural locality.

References 

Rural localities in Kudymkarsky District